Dr. Ekbal Bappukunju is a public health activist, a neurosurgeon, and an academic in Kerala, India and is serving as a member of the Kerala State Planning Board since 2016. He was the Vice-chancellor of the University of Kerala during the period 2000–2004.He completed his pre-degree from St. Berchmans College Changanacherry. He was a member of the Kerala State Planning Board from 1996 to 2000, during which he played a vital role in People's Plan Campaign, a decentralization move by the Government of Kerala.

He was contested in the 
2011 Kerala Legislative Assembly Elections from Changanassery Assembly Constituency as a LDF candidate and lost to UDF candidate former minister
C F Thomas.

He was the chairman of Kerala State Pollution Control Board. He is also one of the joint convenors of Jan Swasthya Abhiyan (Public Health Movement - India). He is the President of the Democratic Alliance For Knowledge Freedom, Kerala.

He was the chairperson of the Expert Committee set up by the Government of Kerala to explore the possibility of setting up a new university of health sciences.  The committee submitted its report on the proposed structure and functions of the university in April 2007.

Ekbal is an activist of Kerala Sastra Sahitya Parishad and has held various offices in the organisation. He was the President of Kerala Sastra Sahithya Parishad from 1983–85. He was former editor of the online Science Journal of Kerala Sastra Sahithya Parishad: www.luca.co.in. His book Indian Oushadha Mekhala Innale Innu received the Abu Dhabi Sakthi Award for Scholarly Literature in 2015. 

Ekbal is a follower of the Communist Party of India (Marxist) (CPI(M)) from which he was expelled in 2004 by left-wing hardliners. His membership was later restored. He is married to Dr. A Meharunnisa, the former principal and Professor of Anatomy of Govt. TD Medical College at Alappuzha and Kottayam Medical College. She is currently working as head of department of anatomy in SUT Medical College Trivandrum.

References

Bibliography

External links

 Original copy of scan affidavit's, Kerala Assembly Election 2011, National Election Watch
 Profile (from 2002)
  Google profile
 Project report on the establishment of medical university in Kerala (From 2007)
 Facebook profile

Indian neurosurgeons
Living people
Academic staff of the University of Kerala
Scholars from Thiruvananthapuram
Indian health activists
20th-century Indian medical doctors
Medical doctors from Thiruvananthapuram
Communist Party of India (Marxist) politicians from Kerala
Politicians from Thiruvananthapuram
20th-century Indian politicians
21st-century Indian politicians
21st-century Indian medical doctors
Activists from Kerala
1948 births
20th-century surgeons
Recipients of the Abu Dhabi Sakthi Award